The list of shipwrecks in May 1825 includes some ships sunk, wrecked or otherwise lost during May 1825.

1 May

3 May

4 May

5 May

6 May

7 May

8 May

9 May

11 May

12 May

14 May

15 May

17 May

18 May

19 May

20 May

21 May

22 May

23 May

25 May

27 May

28 May

31 May

Unknown date

References

1825-05